This is a list of all seasons played by HNK Rijeka in domestic and European football, from 1946 to the most recent completed season.

This list details the club's achievements in all major competitions, and the top scorers for each season (note that only goals scored in league matches are taken into account). Players in bold were also top league scorers that season.

The tables below provide a summary of the club's performance by season in all official competitions, including domestic leagues, cups and European club competitions.

The main source of data is a book by Marinko Lazzarich that documents the history of HNK Rijeka.

Key

League
P = Games played
W = Games won
D = Games drawn
L = Games lost
GF = Goals for
GA = Goals against
Pts = Points
Pos = Final position
↑ = Promoted
↓ = Relegated
N/A = Not available or applicable

Cup/Europe
PR = Preliminary round
PO = Play-off round
QR = Qualifying round
R1 = Round 1
R2 = Round 2
R3 = Round 3
GS = Group stage
QF = Quarter-finals 
SF = Semi-finals
RU = Runners-up
W = Winners

SFR Yugoslavia (1946–1991)

Source: Yugoslav Football Statistics

Croatia (1992–present)

*HNK Rijeka was robbed of the title on the final day by paid off referees

Source: Croatian Football Statistics

Honours
Croatian First League: 1
Winners: 2016–17
Runners-up: 1998–99, 2005–06, 2013–14, 2014–15, 2015–16, 2017–18, 2018–19
Yugoslav First League
Best placed Croatian club: 1964–65, 1983–84, 1986–87
Croatian Cup: 6
Winners: 2004–05, 2005–06, 2013–14, 2016–17, 2018–19, 2019–20
Runners-up: 1993–94, 2021–22
Yugoslav Cup: 2
Winners: 1977–78, 1978–79
Runners-up: 1986–87
Croatian Super Cup: 1
Winners: 2014
Runners-up: 2005, 2006, 2019
UEFA Cup Winners' Cup
Quarter-final: 1979–80
Balkans Cup: 1
Winners: 1977–78
Runners-up: 1979–80

References

Seasons
 
Rijeka
Rijeka Seasons